Under the Frozen Falls is a 1948 British children's film directed by Darrell Catling and starring Harold Warrender, Jacques Brown and Ray Jackson.

The original screenplay was written by Mary Cathcart Borer as a film for children. It was later adapted as a book by J. H. Martin Cross.

The film was one of the four of David Rawnsley's films that used his "independent frame" technique, a form of back projection.

Premise

A party of boys collect lead from a disused lead mine in Somerset, for model making. They become involved with the kidnappers of a distinguished scientist. Lost secret plans and misadventures with dynamite add a thrill to the story.

Cast
 Harold Warrender as Mr. Carlington
 Jacques Brown as Professor Bell-Wrighton 
 Ray Jackson as David Roseby 
 Peter Scott as  Bob 
 Tony Richardson as Peter 
 Claude Hulbert as Riley 
 Ivan Brandt as Thompson 
 Mary Kerridge as Mrs. Roseby 
 Michael Dear as Jim 
 Alexander Field as Keeper of Toyshop

References

External links

1948 films
British black-and-white films
1940s children's films
British children's films
1940s children's adventure films
British children's adventure films
Films produced by Donald Wilson (writer and producer)
Films about kidnapping
Films set in Somerset
Films shot at Station Road Studios, Elstree
1940s English-language films
1940s British films